Elusa diloba is a species of moth of the family Noctuidae. It was described by George Hampson in 1909, and is known from Borneo.

References

Moths described in 1909
Hadeninae
Moths of Borneo